Keith is a given name of Gaelic origin.
It means "wood" or "from the battleground" and shares the same derivation as Clan Keith.
The surname derives from a toponym, Keith Marischal in East Lothian, possibly containing the Brittonic element cet "woods, forest." 
Keith was the 298th most common name given to newborn boys in the United States in 2007.

People with the given name
Keith Abbis (born 1932), English retired footballer
Keith Ablow (born 1961), American author and TV personality
Keith Ackerman (born 1946), American bishop
Keith Acton (born 1958), Canadian former ice hockey player
Keith Adams (disambiguation), several people
Keith Adamson (born 1945), English former footballer
Keith Agovida (born 1990), Filipino basketball player
Keith Ahlers (born 1955), British race car driver
Keith Aitken (born 1942), former Australian rugby league player
Keith Allan (actor) (born 1969), American actor and screenwriter
Keith Allan (linguist) (born 1943), Australian linguist
Keith William Allan (1946–2000), Australian solicitor and murder victim
Keith Anderson (born 1968), American country music artist
Keith Andrews (footballer) (born 1980), Irish footballer
Keith Baldwin (born 1960), American football player
Keith Barnes (born 1934), Australian rugby league player
Keith Beavers (born 1983), Canadian backstroke and medley swimmer
Keith Beebe (1921–1998), American football player
Keith Beirne (born 1996/1997), Leitrim Gaelic footballer
Keith Bennett (basketball) (born 1961), American-Israeli basketball player
Keith Berry (fighter) (born 1987), American mixed martial artist
Keith Berry (musician) (born 1973), London-based musician and composer
Keith Booth (born 1974), American basketball player
Keith Braxton (born 1997), American basketball player
Keith Buckley (born 1979), American musician, vocalist for Every Time I Die and The Damned Things
Keith Caputo (born 1973), American musician, vocalist for Life of Agony
Keith Carney (born 1970), American hockey player
Keith Carradine (born 1949), American actor
Keith Chegwin (1957–2017), British television presenter
Gilbert Keith Chesterton (1874–1936), British writer
Keith Cieplicki (born 1963), American basketball player and coach
Keith Coleman (disambiguation), several people
Keith Coogan (born 1970), American actor
Keith Farrelle Cozart (born 1995), stage name Chief Keef, American rapper and songwriter
Keith Dambrot (born 1958), American college basketball coach
Keith David (born 1956), American actor
Keith Douglas (1920–1944), British poet
Keith Eaman (born 1947), Canadian football player
Keith Earls (born 1987), Irish rugby union player
Keith Elam (1966–2010), American hip hop artist
Keith Ellison (born 1963), American politician and lawyer
Keith Emerson (1944–2016), English musician and composer
Keith Erickson (born 1944), American basketball player
Keith Falconer Fletcher (born 1900), American politician
Keith Ferguson (disambiguation), several people
Keith Flint (1969–2019), member of British electronica band The Prodigy
Keith Flowers (1930–1993), American football player
Keith Floyd (1943–2009), British chef
Keith Ford (born 1994), American football player
Keith Fowler (born 1939), American actor, director, producer and educator
Keith Galloway (born 1985), Australian rugby league footballer
Keith Valentine Graham (born 1958), better known as Levi Roots, British-Jamaican musician, celebrity chef and businessman
Keith Getty (born 1974), Irish musician
Keith Green (1953–1982), American musician
Keith Haring (1958–1990), American artist
Keith Harkin (born 1986), Irish solo musician and former principal singer of all-male musical group Celtic Thunder
Keith Harris (cricketer) (born 1957), English cricketer
Keith Harris (record producer) (born 1976), American record producer, songwriter and musician
Keith Harris (rugby league) (born 1954), Australian former rugby league footballer
Keith Harris (ventriloquist) (1947–2015), English ventriloquist
Keith R. Harris (born 1953), English financier
Keith Henson (born 1942), American electrical engineer and writer on life extension, cryonics, memetics and evolutionary psychology
Keith Hitchins (1931–2020), American historian and professor
Keith Hodge (born 1974), American comedian of the Hodgetwins
Keith Hernandez (born 1953), American baseball player
Keith Hitchins (1931–2020), American historian
Keith Holyoake (1904–1983), former Prime Minister of New Zealand (1957, 1960–1972)
Keith Ismael (born 1998), American football player
Keith Jackson (1928–2016), American sportscaster
Keith Jackson (defensive tackle) (born 1985), American football player
Keith Jackson (tight end) (born 1965), American football player
Keith Jardine (born 1975), American mixed martial artist
Keith Jarrett (born 1945), American jazz pianist
Keith Hunter Jesperson (born 1955), Canadian-American serial killer
Keith Keane (born 1986), Irish footballer
Keith Kidd (born 1962), American football player
Keith Kirkwood (born 1993), American football player
Keith Lamb (musician) (born 1952), Australian singer and songwriter
Keith Langford (born 1983), American basketball player
Keith Lee (American football) (born 1957), American football player
Keith Lee (basketball)  (born 1962), American basketball player
Keith Levene  (1957–2022), English musician
Keith Lincoln (1939–2019), American football player
Keith Lockhart (baseball) (born 1964), American baseball player
Keith Lulia (born 1987), Australian-Cook Islander Rugby League player
Keith Maillard (born 1942), American-Canadian novelist and poet
Keith Malley  (born 1974), American comedian and podcaster
Keith Mansfield (born 1941), British composer and arranger
Keith Mansfield (writer) (born 1965), English novelist and publisher
Keith Mant (1919–2000), British forensic pathologist
Keith McHenry (born 1957), American anarchist and activist
Keith Miller (1919–2004), Australian cricketer
Keith Moon (1946–1978), English rock drummer
Keith Moreland (born 1954), American baseball player
Keith Morgan (judoka) (born 1973), Canadian judoka
Keith Murdoch (1885–1952), Australian journalist and publisher
Keith Murray (rapper) (born 1974), American hip hop artist
Keith Newman (born 1977), American football player
Keith Olbermann (born 1959), American sportscaster and political commentator 
Keith Owens (born 1969), American basketball player
Keith Park (1892–1975), New Zealand Air Marshall of World War II
Keith Parkinson (1958–2005), American fantasy artist
Keith Parkinson (rugby league), Australian rugby league player
Keith Powell (born 1979), American actor
Keith Price (born 1991), American football player
Keith Reaser (born 1991), American football player
Keith Relf (1943–1976), English musician and vocalist
Keith Richards (born 1943), English rock guitarist and songwriter
Keith Ridgway (born 1965), Irish writer
Keith Rupert Murdoch (born 1931), international businessman
Keith Sanderson (born 1975), American sport shooter
Keith Scott (footballer) (born 1967), former professional footballer
Keith Scott (musician) (born 1954), Canadian guitar player
Keith Scott (voice actor) (born 1953), Australian voice actor, impressionist and animation historian
Keith Stewart  (1739–1795), Scottish Admiral and MP in the British Parliament
Keith Strickland (born 1953), American rock musician, songwriter and member of the band The B-52s
Keith Sweat (born 1961), American R&B singer
Keith Szarabajka (born 1952), American actor
Keith Taylor (disambiguation), multiple people
Keith Thomas, American film director
Keith Thornton (born 1963), American rapper better known as Kool Keith
Keith Tkachuk (born 1972), American hockey player
Keith Towbridge (born 1995), American football player
Keith Urban (born 1967), Australian country music singer
Keith Van Horn (born 1975), American basketball player
Shane Keith Warne (1969–2022), Australian cricket player
Keith Wells (1962–1994), American murderer
Keith West (born 1943), English rock singer and songwriter
Keith Whitley (1955–1989), American country music singer
Keith Daniel Williams (1947–1996), American murderer
Keith Wood (born 1972), Irish rugby union player
Keith Woolner (born c. 1968), American baseball analyst
Keith Yandle (born 1986), American hockey player
Keith Zettlemoyer (1955–1995), American murderer

Fictional characters
 Keith (Voltron), a main character of Voltron: Legendary Defender
 Keith Dudemeister, a supporting character in Scrubs
 Dr. Keith Ricks, a dolphin researcher, one of the main characters of the TV series Flipper (1995 TV series), portrayed by Brian Wimmer
 Keith Watson, from the TV series The Electric Company
 Keith Partridge, oldest son, lead singer and guitarist in the American sitcom the Partridge Family
 Keith Mars, father of the titular character in the American TV-series Veronica Mars

See also
 Kieth, another given name

References

English masculine given names
Scottish masculine given names

fr:Keith